David Charles Wotton AM (born 14 August 1942) is a former Australian politician. He was a Liberal Party member of the South Australian House of Assembly between 1975 and 2002, representing the electorates of Murray and Heysen.

Aside from the 1982 Mitcham by-election, Wotton presided over the closest win versus the Democrats in South Australian history, winning against them by a two-candidate preferred margin of 1.9% in the 1997 election.

In 2012 he was made a Member of the Order of Australia (AM) "For service to the Parliament and community of South Australia through contributions to environmental management, family and community services, and the ageing".

References 

Members of the South Australian House of Assembly
Liberal Party of Australia members of the Parliament of South Australia
1942 births
Living people
Members of the Order of Australia
Liberal and Country League politicians
21st-century Australian politicians